The 2023 Liga Femenina, also known as Liga Femenina Pluspetrol 2023 for sponsorship reasons, will be the 3rd season of the Peruvian Liga Femenina, the highest level of Peruvian women's football. The season began on 2 April and ended on 25 September with the final.

Unlike the previous season, the tournament is being played in a decentralized way with each team playing matches at their respective home stadium.

Alianza Lima are the defending champions. The champions will qualify for the 2023 Copa Libertadores Femenina.

Teams
A total of 14 teams played in the 2023 Liga Femenina season, the top 11 teams that played in the previous 2022 season, plus the 2022 Copa Perú Femenina champions Melgar, the 2022 Copa Perú Femenina runner-up Defensores del Ilucán and Sporting Victoria, the winners of the promotion/relegation play-off.

Stadia and locations

Regular stage

Results
The match schedule was decided based on the draw which was held on 16 March 2023.

Play-offs

Bracket 
The semi-final matchups were:
SF1: Hexagonal 1st place vs. Hexagonal 4th place
SF2: Hexagonal 2nd place vs. Hexagonal 3rd place

Semi-finals 
In the semi-finals, if a match was level at the end of normal 90 minutes playing time, extra time was not played and a penalty shoot-out was used to determine the winners.

See also
 2023 Copa Perú Femenina

References

2023 in South American football leagues
2023 in Peruvian football